The Hundred of Mobilong is a cadastral unit of hundred on the west bank of the Murray River in South Australia and centred on Murray Bridge. One of the ten hundreds of the County of Sturt, it is bounded on the east entirely by the Murray River. It was named after an aboriginal name for the swamplands in the vicinity on the west bank of the Murray.

Etymology
According to South Australian historian Geoffrey Manning, the word Mobilong is a corruption of the Aboriginal term mupulawangk, meaning "soft reed place" as "reeds along the [Murray] river bank were used in the making of coiled baskets." Mobilong was also the original name for the early township of Murray Bridge and is the present name for the suburb of Mobilong, which covers the Mobilong Swamp area immediately north of the city centre.

Localities
The following localities and suburbs of the Murray Bridge Council area are situated inside (or partly inside) the bounds of the Hundred of Mobilong:
 Tepko (southern half only)
 Caloote (southern half only)
 Wall Flat (southern half only)
 Woodlane
 Pallamana
 Mypolonga
 Murray Bridge North
 Toora
 Rocky Gully
 Northern Heights
 Mobilong
 Murray Bridge
 White Hill
 Monarto South (north east portion only)
 Gifford Hill
 Murray Bridge South
 Swanport
 Riverglen

Local government
The District Council of Mobilong was established in 1884, bringing local government to the hundred. From 1924 to 1977 the Corporate Town of Murray Bridge formed a second separate local government body within the hundred, and the district council expanded to govern most of land encapsulated by the easterly neighbouring hundreds of Burdett and Ettrick as well as land in the south neighbouring Hundred of Brinkley. The town and district councils merged in 1977 to bring the hundred back under the governance of an expanded single body called the District Council of Murray Bridge.

See also
 Lands administrative divisions of South Australia
 Mobilong Prison

References

Mobilong